The Kastuś Kalinoŭski Regiment (also known as simply Połk Kalinoŭskaha or the Kalinoŭski Regiment, formerly the Kastuś Kalinoŭski Battalion until May 2022) is a group of Belarusian opposition volunteers, which was formed to defend Ukraine against the 2022 Russian invasion.

As of March 2022, it was reported that more than a thousand Belarusians have applied to join the unit. According to its own statements, the battalion is not incorporated into the International Legion of Territorial Defense of Ukraine in order to preserve greater autonomy. Belarusian volunteers in the International Legion are organised in the Pahonia Regiment.

The unit is named after the Polish-Belarusian national hero Kastus Kalinowski, who was a leader of the January Uprising in 1863 against the Russian Empire in Belarus.

The regiment is confirmed to have suffered seven killed as of July 2022.

History

Donbas War, 2014-21

The first foreign volunteer group in Ukraine during the Russo-Ukrainian War was the Pahonia detachment, founded in 2014 during the War in Donbas. The following year, the tactical group "Belarus" was formed uniting Belarusian volunteers fighting in different battalions The Monument to the Belarusians who died for Ukraine in Kyiv is dedicated to the Belarusian volunteers who died during the Russian-Ukrainian War.

2022 Russian invasion

On March 9, the creation of the Kastuś Kalinoŭski Battalion was announced. The battalion is named after Kastuś Kalinoŭski, a 19th-century Belarusian leader of the 1863 January Uprising against the Russian Empire. It was reported that as of 5 March 2022, about 200 Belarusians had joined the battalion. Their motto is ‘First Ukraine, then Belarus’, indicating the volunteers' wish to also liberate Minsk from the Lukashenko regime.

On 13 March, the deputy commander of the battalion, nicknamed "Tur" (real name Aliaksiej Skoblia), was confirmed killed in the Kyiv offensive when his unit was ambushed. On 13 April, Ukrainian President Zelenskyy posthumously awarded Skoblia the title of Hero of Ukraine "for personal courage and heroism in defending the state sovereignty and territorial integrity of Ukraine, loyalty to the military oath."

On 25 March, it was reported the battalion had taken an oath and has been formally admitted to the Ukrainian military. On 29 March, the Kastuś Kalinoŭski Battalion volunteers fought alongside Ukrainian soldiers to recapture Irpin. On 26 March, Dzmitry Apanasovich (“Terror”) was killed during fighting in Irpin.

On 1 April, it was reported that thousands of volunteers — many of whom were dissidents who had been arrested following the 2020–2021 Belarusian protests — had applied to be members of the battalion, but that vetting and equipping these volunteers had created a backlog that slowed down their deployment.

On 16 May, a company commander, identified as Pavel "Volat," was reported to have died during the war in Ukraine. The Belarusian newspaper Nasha Niva stated that Volat was the sixth Belarusian fighter killed since the start of the war.

On 21 May, it was announced that the battalion would become a regiment comprising two separate battalions. This was presented as "a move to the next stage of building a [Belarusian] national military unit" which "tak[es] into account the scale of the tasks facing the Belarusian soldiers".

On 17 June, it was announced that volunteers of the Regiment received state Ukrainian decorations "For Battle Merit" and "Ukraine Above All".

On 25-26 June 2022, in Lysychansk, the commander of the Volat battalion, callsign Brest, was killed in action and several other Belarusian fighters were captured or missing.

On 11 July 2022, KKR volunteer soldiers Yan Dyurbeiko (call sign "Trombli") and Sergey Degtev ("Kleshch") were put on the POW exchange list.

In December 2022, the regiment received a BMP-2 armored vehicle, and in January 2023 a captured T-72 tank. The regiment announced the formation of the first mechanized unit.

Structure
The Regiment consists of two battalions, "Litwin" and "Wolat".

Reactions 
The battalion has been featured on public posters in Kyiv to illustrate Ukrainian-Belarusian military ties.

The creation of the battalion was endorsed by Belarusian opposition leader Sviatlana Tsikhanouskaya, who noted that "more and more people from Belarus join to help Ukrainians defend their country". President of Belarus Alexander Lukashenko, an ally of Russian president Vladimir Putin, called the volunteers "crazed citizens".

On March 26, Deputy Head of the GUBOPiK of the Ministry of Internal Affairs of Belarus Mikhail Bedunkevich stated that a criminal case had been instituted in Belarus against 50 people from the Kastuś Kalinoŭski Battalion for participating in an armed conflict in a foreign state.

In November 2022, the European Parliament adopted a resolution expressing its support for the Kastus Kalinouski Regiment.

Commemoration 
In the city of Rivne a street was named after Kastuś Kalinoŭski in honor of the Belarusian volunteers.

Notable members 
 , undersecretary battalion commander, one of the founders of the civic youth organization Zubr
 Aliaksiej Skoblia
 Pavel Shurmei, former Belarusian Olympic rower and world record holder
 , chairman of the Young Front

See also 
 International Legion of Territorial Defense of Ukraine
 Tactical group "Belarus"

Notes

References

External links 
 
 Official Telegram channel
 Official Website of the Kastuś Kalinoŭski Regiment

2022 establishments in Ukraine
Belarus in the 2022 Russian invasion of Ukraine
Belarus–Ukraine relations
Belarusian opposition
Military units and formations established in 2022
Foreign volunteer units resisting the 2022 Russian invasion of Ukraine
Territorial defence battalions of Ukraine
Armies in exile
Belarus in the Russo-Ukrainian War